Mary Gamewell may refer to:
 Mary Porter Gamewell (1848–1906), American missionary to China; also teacher, speaker, and writer
 Mary Ninde Gamewell (1858–1947), American missionary to China; also writer